Rubus bushii, common name Bush's blackberry, is a rare North American species of flowering plant in the rose family. It has been found only in the central United States (Kansas, Missouri, Arkansas, Oklahoma, northeastern Texas).

The genetics of Rubus is extremely complex, so that it is difficult to decide on which groups should be recognized as species. There are many rare species with limited ranges such as this. Further study is suggested to clarify the taxonomy.

References

bushii
Plants described in 1932
Flora of the United States